In the field of molecular biology, the peroxisome proliferator-activated receptors (PPARs) are a group of nuclear receptor proteins that function as transcription factors regulating the expression of genes.  PPARs play essential roles in the regulation of cellular differentiation, development, and metabolism (carbohydrate, lipid, protein), and tumorigenesis of higher organisms.

Nomenclature and tissue distribution 

Three types of PPARs have been identified: alpha, gamma, and delta (beta):
 α (alpha) - expressed in liver, kidney, heart, muscle, adipose tissue, and others
 β/δ (beta/delta) - expressed in many tissues, especially in brain, adipose tissue, and skin
 γ (gamma) - although transcribed by the same gene, this PPAR, by way of alternative splicing, is expressed in three forms:
 γ1 - expressed in virtually all tissues, including heart, muscle, colon, kidney, pancreas, and spleen
 γ2 - expressed mainly in adipose tissue; it is 30 amino acids longer than γ1
 γ3 - expressed in macrophages, large intestine, white adipose tissue

History 
These agents, pharmacologically related to the fibrates were discovered in the early 1980s.

PPARs were originally identified in Xenopus frogs as receptors that induce the proliferation of peroxisomes in cells in 1992.
The first PPAR (PPARα) was discovered in 1990 during the search for a molecular target of a group of agents then referred to as peroxisome proliferators, as they increased peroxisomal numbers in rodent liver tissue, apart from improving insulin sensitivity.  

When it turned out that PPARs played a much more versatile role in biology, the agents were in turn termed PPAR ligands. The best-known PPAR ligands are the thiazolidinediones.

After PPARδ (delta) was identified in humans in 1992, it turned out to be closely related to PPARβ (beta), previously described during the same year in an amphibian, Xenopus. The term "PPARδ" is generally used in the US, whereas the use of "PPARβ" has remained in Europe, where this receptor was initially discovered in Xenopus.

PPARs were so-named because they were discovered to induce peroxisome proliferation in rodents, but this induction of peroxisome proliferation is not believed to occur in humans.

Physiological function 
All PPARs heterodimerize with the retinoid X receptor (RXR) and bind to specific regions on the DNA of target genes.  These DNA sequences are termed PPREs (peroxisome proliferator hormone response elements). The DNA consensus sequence is AGGTCANAGGTCA, with N being any nucleotide. In general, this sequence occurs in the promoter region of a gene, and, when the PPAR binds its ligand, transcription of target genes is increased or decreased, depending on the gene. The RXR also forms a heterodimer with a number of other receptors (e.g., vitamin D and thyroid hormone).

The function of PPARs is modified by the precise shape of their ligand-binding domain (see below) induced by ligand binding and by a number of coactivator and corepressor proteins, the presence of which can stimulate or inhibit receptor function, respectively.

Endogenous ligands for the PPARs include free fatty acids, eicosanoids and Vitamin B3. PPARγ is activated by PGJ2 (a prostaglandin) and certain members of the 5-HETE family of arachidonic acid metabolites including 5-oxo-15(S)-HETE and 5-oxo-ETE. In contrast, PPARα is activated by leukotriene B4.  Certain members of the 15-hydroxyeicosatetraenoic acid family of arachidonic acid metabolites, including 15(S)-HETE, 15(R)-HETE, and 15-HpETE activate to varying degrees PPAR alpha, beta/delta, and gamma. In addition, PPARγ was reported to be involved in cancer pathogenesis and growth. PPARγ activation by agonist RS5444 may inhibit anaplastic thyroid cancer growth. See for a review and critique of the roles of PPAR gamma in cancer.

Genetics 
The three main forms of PPAR are transcribed from different genes:
 PPARα - chromosome 22q12-13.1 (OMIM 170998)
 PPARβ/δ - chromosome 6p21.2-21.1 (OMIM 600409)
 PPARγ - chromosome 3p25 (OMIM 601487).

Hereditary disorders of all 3 of these PPARs have been described, generally leading to a loss in function and concomitant lipodystrophy, insulin resistance, and/or acanthosis nigricans. Of PPARγ, a gain-of-function mutation has been described and studied: Pro12Ala, which decreases the risk of insulin resistance. It is quite prevalent, with an allele frequency of 0.03 - 0.12 in some populations. In contrast, pro115gln is associated with obesity.

Structure 
Like other nuclear receptors, PPARs are modular in structure and contain the following functional domains:
 (A/B) -  N-terminal region
 (C) DBD - DNA-binding domain
 (D) - flexible hinge region
 (E) LBD - ligand binding domain
 (F) C-terminal region

The DBD contains two zinc finger motifs, which bind to specific sequences of DNA known as hormone response elements when the receptor is activated.

 The LBD has an extensive secondary structure consisting of 13 alpha helices and a beta sheet.  Both natural and synthetic ligands can bind to the LBD, either activating or repressing the receptor's activity.

Pharmacology and PPAR modulators 

PPARα and PPARγ are the molecular targets of a number of marketed drugs. 

For instance the hypolipidemic fibrates activate PPARα.

The anti diabetic thiazolidinediones activate PPARγ. 

The synthetic chemical perfluorooctanoic acid activates PPARα while perfluorononanoic acid activates both PPARα and PPARγ. 

Berberine inactivates PPARγ. 

Other natural compounds from different chemical classes activate or inactivate PPARγ.

See also 
 Metabolic syndrome
Endocannabinoid system

References

External links 
  (PPAR Resource Page, Penn State University).
  (Nuclear Receptor Resource).
 PPAR reference outline  (Rutgers University).
 
  - the Peroxisome Proliferator-Activated Receptor Structure in Interactive 3D

1